La Monte Township is an inactive township in Pettis County, in the U.S. state of Missouri.

La Monte Township was erected in 1873, and named after the community of La Monte, Missouri.

References

Townships in Missouri
Townships in Pettis County, Missouri